The United States Invitational Young Physicists Tournament (USIYPT) is an annual physics research and debate tournament for high school students, held the last weekend in January. School-based teams of four students investigate several undergraduate-level research problems in preparation for the tournament.  The competition itself consists of "physics fights," student-led debates over the quality of each team's solution. Teams are judged on their own solutions to the problems and on their ability to engage in evaluation and discussion of other teams' solutions. The Harker School of California and Phillips Exeter Academy of New Hampshire have each earned three championships, the most of any school. The 2023 tournament was hosted on February 4th-5th, 2023 at The Nueva School, with Nueva defending their champion title from the prior year.

History 
The United States sent teams to the International Young Physicists' Tournament several times in the 2000s, and achieved a second-place finish in 2005. The nonprofit United States Association for Young Physicists Tournaments was incorporated in 2005, initially for the purpose of supporting and training the US team as well as to spread the pedagogical methodology of preparing and conducting the "physics fight." In 2007, the USAYPT organized their own Young Physicists Tournament, inviting school-based teams from around the world to debate over a slate of four research problems. The one-day event at the North Carolina School of Science and Math (NCSSM) included five teams, all from the United States; Woodberry Forest School won the inaugural championship.

The 2008 tournament, also at NCSSM, included the first "international" team: Brisbane Girls Grammar School. They faced Woodberry Forest School, a boys' boarding school in central Virginia. In the final physics fight, Brisbane's Sarah Thang and Samantha Luck outdueled Woodberry's Chris McLamb and Robert Bauer for the title.

For 2009 and 2010, the event was moved to Woodberry Forest School. Raffles Institution of Singapore beat out an eight-team field for the 2009 title.  However, the "snowmaggedon" blizzard of February forced cancellation of the 2010 tournament.  Instead, two informal mini-tournaments were held in April, one at Woodberry Forest School, one at the Harker School in California.

The USIYPT moved to Oak Ridge Associated Universities for 2011 and 2012, and expanded to a two-day, six-round event. Teams and jurors toured Oak Ridge National Laboratory in between sets of physics fights, viewing the High Flux Isotope Reactor and the Spallation Neutron Source. Official sponsorship in 2011 came from the University of Tennessee department of physics, among others. The Harker School won in 2011; Rye Country Day School of New York won in 2012. Oak Ridge High School won the first-ever Clifford Swartz Trophy for top performance in the tournament's poster session.

The 2014 tournament was held at the Harker School in San Jose, California.  The Harker School won the title with playoff victories over Woodberry Forest School and Shenzhen Middle School on the "Magnet Stack" and "Ball Stack" problems.  Guilderland High School of New York won the Clifford Swartz Trophy for best poster.

In 2015, the USIYPT moved back to Woodberry Forest School.  The final rounds were switched to a pool-play format.  The Harker School and Woodberry Forest met twice in those final rounds, with Harker edging Woodberry 79-77 for the 2016 title.  Other finalists included Rye Country Day, who were 1/10 of a point off Woodberry's pace; and first-time USIYPT participant Renmin University High School of Beijing, China.

Second-year participant Phoenixville Area High School of Pennsylvania topped the standings after the preliminary rounds in the 2016 USIYPT.  They, Harker, Rye Country Day School, and Shenzhen Middle School  competed in the final rounds, with Shenzhen coasting to the championship.

At the 2017 tournament at the University of the Sciences, the Harker School was the highest ranked of the six teams who entered the playoff rounds.  Rye Country Day School emerged from those rounds with a convincing victory of 77-72 against RDFZ of Beijing, due in part to an especially innovative approach to measuring Planck's constant conducted by Charlie Curnin and Kasey Luo in their high school laboratory.

In 2018, Randolph College hosted the largest-ever USIYPT, including fifteen schools from all over the US and the world.  Phillips Exeter Academy won their first-ever trophy in their fourth year of participation.

At the 2019 tournament at Rye Country Day School, Phillips Exeter Academy won their second straight championship, with first-time attendees Phillips Andover Academy in second place. In the late stages of the tournament, Swartz Trophy winners Pioneer School of Ariana, Tunisia and The Harker School competed in the first partially student-juried physics fight.

In 2020, Cary Academy won their first championship in school history, after facing Woodberry Forest School, Phillips Andover Academy, and Phillips Exeter Academy in the final rounds.

Due to COVID, the 2021 tournament was hosted online. The Nueva School, Phillips Exeter Academy, and Woodberry Forest School made the three-team round-robin final round.  Phillips Exeter Academy emerged on top with their third-ever championship.

In 2023, The Nueva School won their second championship in a row, overhauling their preliminary round points disadvantage against Phillips Exeter Academy to win 86.99 to 79.80 in the final round. Of the 11 participating teams, 6 made it through the preliminary rounds and competed in the final.

The Physics Fight 
The USIYPT consists of six preliminary rounds and a set of final rounds.  In each round, called a "Physics Fight," a student from the reporting team presents a 10-minute summary of their research into one of the four official tournament problems.  Next, a student from another team engages the reporter in a 12-minute conversation about the reporting team's project.  This opponent is charged with helping the audience understand the strengths and weaknesses of the report by means of a series of discussion questions.  Only after this conversation is complete are jury members allowed to question the presenting students directly.  Teams are judged as much on their ability to ask and answer questions in the physics fight as on the quality of their initial presentations.

Teacher education 
Unusual among science competitions, the USIYPT aims to improve physics teaching skills as well as student understanding of the subject. High school teachers are participating members of each school's research team. The sponsoring organization chooses problems for each tournament that are "nontrivial, but not impossible," whose solutions are not necessarily unknown to practicing professional physicists, but are generally new to high school teachers and students. Research is expected to be conducted primarily in each team's school, with direction and assistance from a teacher at that school.

Results

List of Participating Schools 
 The Harker School, California – 12 tournaments, 3 championships
 Phillips Exeter Academy, New Hampshire – 6 tournaments, 3 championships
 The Nueva School, California – 5 tournaments, 2 championships
 Rye Country Day School, New York – 14 tournaments, 2 championships
 Shenzhen Middle School, China – 9 tournaments, 2 championships
 Woodberry Forest School, Virginia – 14 tournaments, 1 championship
 Cary Academy, North Carolina – 6 tournaments, 1 championship
 Brisbane Girls Grammar School, Australia – 2 tournaments, 1 championship
 Raffles Institution, Singapore – 1 tournament, 1 championship
 Pioneer School of Ariana, Tunisia – 8 tournaments
 Nanjing Foreign Language School, China – 5 tournaments
 Qingdao No. 2 High School, China – 4 tournaments
 Vanke Meisha Academy, China – 4 tournaments
 Princeton International School of Science and Mathematics, New Jersey – 4 tournaments
 High School affiliated with Renmin University, China – 4 tournaments
 Phillips Andover Academy, Massachusetts – 3 tournaments
 Phoenixville Area High School, Pennsylvania – 3 tournaments
 Wildwood School, California – 3 tournaments
 Episcopal High School, Virginia – 2 tournaments
 Oak Ridge High School, Tennessee – 2 tournaments
 North Carolina School of Science and Mathematics– 2 tournaments
 Oregon Episcopal School – 2 tournaments
 Vistamar School, California – 2 tournaments
 Guilderland High School, New York – 2 tournaments
 Pioneer School of Manzeh 8, Tunisia – 2 tournaments
 Spartanburg Day School, South Carolina – 2 tournaments
 High School of Jur Hronec, Slovak Republic – 1 tournament
 Calverton School, Maryland – 1 tournament
 Madeira School, Virginia – 1 tournament
 Georgian English-Spanish School, Tbilisi – 1 tournament
 UG School, Tbilisi – 1 tournament
 Deep Run High School, Virginia – 1 tournament

References

External links 
Official site of the US Association for Young Physicists Tournaments
The Problem Master's Blog, containing the current problems and advice for teams

Youth science
Student quiz competitions
Physics organizations
Physics competitions
International Young Physicists' Tournament
Education competitions in the United States
Youth in the United States
Recurring events established in 2007
Science events in the United States
Annual events in the United States